Lake Louise (Sasnuu’ Bene’ in Ahtna) is a census-designated place (CDP) in Matanuska-Susitna Borough, Alaska, United States. Although it is an isolated settlement and is close to Glennallen, it is considered part of the Anchorage Metropolitan Area, like all other locations in the Mat-Su Borough. At the 2020 census the population was 15, down from 46 in 2010 and 88 in 2000.

The first recorded name of Lake Louise was Shosubenich, which means "great flat water with many islands". Later, Lake Louise was named "Lake Adah" after a girlfriend of Lieutenant Castner. Later Captain Edwin Glenn changed the name to "Lake Louise" in honor of his wife. The U.S. Army established a recreation facility at the lake towards the end of World War II and built the first road into the area. There are still several dilapidated cabins at the "Army Point" campground, including one that was used for four days by General Dwight D. Eisenhower before he was president. The lake is home to the Lake Louise State Recreation Area.

Geography
Lake Louise is located along the eastern edge of Matanuska-Susitna Borough at  (62.284498, -146.557029). Lake Louise is located between four mountain ranges: the Wrangell, Talkeetna, Chugach and Alaska ranges.

There are many small islands at the south end of the lake, most of which have homes built on them. There are also several private resorts and marinas, and a state recreation area with campgrounds and a boat launch.

Demographics

Lake Louise first appeared on the 2000 U.S. Census as a census-designated place (CDP).

As of the census of 2000, there were 88 people, 41 households, and 25 families residing in the CDP. The population density was 1.8 people per square mile (0.7/km2). There were 255 housing units at an average density of 5.3/sq mi (2.1/km2). The racial makeup of the CDP was 89.77% White and 10.23% Native American.

There were 41 households, out of which 17.1% had children under the age of 18 living with them, 58.5% were married couples living together, 2.4% had a female householder with no husband present, and 39.0% were non-families. 24.4% of all households were made up of individuals, and 2.4% had someone living alone who was 65 years of age or older. The average household size was 2.15 and the average family size was 2.64.

In the CDP, the population was spread out, with 17.0% under the age of 18, 1.1% from 18 to 24, 27.3% from 25 to 44, 46.6% from 45 to 64, and 8.0% who were 65 years of age or older. The median age was 47 years. For every 100 females, there were 114.6 males. For every 100 females age 18 and over, there were 135.5 males.

The median income for a household in the CDP was $5,000, and the median income for a family was $43,750. Males had a median income of $3,750 versus $0 for females. The per capita income for the CDP was $11,057. There were no families and 56.7% of the population living below the poverty line, including no under eighteens and none of those over 64.

Recreation area
The Lake Louise State Recreation Area has a large campground, boat launch, and picnic areas, as well as a trail leading to the hilltop where the Army's original recreation area's cabins still stand, although in a state of severe disrepair. Visitors can expect to see a wide variety of wildlife, including the only known freshwater nesting site for cormorants, located on Bird Island. In the fall the Nelchina caribou herd passes through this area. The fishing in the lake is considered excellent, with a variety of freshwater fish, including lake trout and burbot.

References

Census-designated places in Matanuska-Susitna Borough, Alaska
Census-designated places in Alaska
Anchorage metropolitan area